Phryneta ellioti is a species of beetle in the family Cerambycidae. It was described by Charles Joseph Gahan in 1909. It is known from Uganda and the Democratic Republic of the Congo.

References

Phrynetini
Beetles described in 1909